Wesley Wade Watkins (born December 15, 1938) is an American politician from the state of Oklahoma. Watkins is a retired member of the United States House of Representatives where he had represented  for 14 years as a Democrat and then for six years as a Republican.

Early life and career
Wesley Wade Watkins was born to Losie Virgil Watkins Sr. and Mary Etta Johnson Watkins. Wes has one older sister, Mary Althea Yeats Watkins and an older brother, Losie Virgil "L.V." Watkins Jr. Watkins was born in De Queen, Arkansas but moved to Oklahoma as a boy. He graduated from Oklahoma State University in 1960, receiving a Master's degree from that same school in 1961. After a brief stint working for the United States Department of Agriculture, he worked as an administrator at his alma mater from 1963 to 1966. During that time, he was initiated into Tau Kappa Epsilon fraternity as an honorary member while serving as their faculty advisor. In 1972, he was elected to the Common Cause National Governing Board. Later, he spent two years heading one of the first economic development districts in the country, based in Ada.

Entry into politics
Watkins became active in Democratic party politics in the early 1970s, and was elected to the Oklahoma State Senate in 1974. Two years later, U.S. House Speaker Carl Albert announced his retirement after 30 years representing the 3rd District. Based in the southeastern part of the state, an area known as Little Dixie, the 3rd was heavily Democratic in both local and national elections. Watkins faced a formidable opponent in Albert's popular longtime Chief of Staff and Administrative Assistant, Charles Ward. However, Watkins had closer local ties in the district, while Ward had spent decades in Washington. Watkins prevailed in the Democratic primary runoff and he then gained Albert's endorsement and won the general election with 82% of the vote. He was re-elected six more times, always by close to 80% of the vote. For most of this time, he served on the Budget or Appropriations Committees, allowing him to bring large amounts of money to his mostly rural and agricultural district. He was also very active in oil and natural gas issues, and took particularly strong interest in economic development issues for his rural district.

Campaigns for Governor
Watkins did not seek an eighth term in 1990, instead running for the Democratic nomination for governor to succeed Republican Henry Bellmon. He raised $3 million for his campaign, the most ever raised for a gubernatorial bid in Oklahoma at the time. In the Democratic primary, he ran ahead of House Speaker Steve Lewis, yet lost to eventual winner David Walters, who had been the Democratic Gubernatorial nominee 4 years earlier in 1986.

Watkins was openly disappointed in the lack of support from the state Democratic hierarchy. In 1994, Watkins ran for governor again, this time as an independent. He only won 23% of the vote. However, his independent candidacy siphoned off enough votes from Lieutenant Governor Jack Mildren, the Democratic candidate, to allow Frank Keating, a Reagan administration official, to become only the third Republican governor in Oklahoma history at that point. Watkins tallied over 233,000 votes, far more than Keating's 171,000-vote margin over Mildren. He dominated his former congressional district, winning many of the counties there by large margins.

Return to Congress
In 1996, Brewster decided to retire from Congress as it became known that Watkins wanted his seat back. The Republican House leadership persuaded Watkins to run as a Republican, seeing a chance to win a seat where they had never made a serious bid since Oklahoma joined the Union in 1907. They promised Watkins a seat on the Ways and Means Committee with full seniority if he ran as a Republican and won. No congressman had ever served on all three of the major financial committees (Appropriations, Budget and Ways and Means) before. Despite Albert endorsing Watkins' Democratic opponent, State Senator Darryl Roberts, Watkins won a narrow victory, becoming the first Republican to represent Little Dixie since statehood (it had previously been the 4th District from 1907 to 1915, and had been the 3rd since 1915).

Watkins initially planned to retire from office in 1998 after undergoing back surgery, but was persuaded to run again. He was handily re-elected that year, defeating Walt Roberts. He faced no major-party opposition when he ran for his third term in 2000.

Watkins' voting record in his first period in Congress had been characterized as somewhat moderate. During his second period, however, his voting record was strongly conservative, usually receiving ratings in the high 90s from the American Conservative Union.

Retirement from Congress
Oklahoma lost a congressional seat after the 2000 census due to slower than expected population growth. The final map saw Watkins' district dismantled, with its territory split between three nearby districts.  His home in Stillwater (where he had lived since 1990) was drawn into the western Oklahoma-based 3rd district (the former 6th district), represented by fellow Republican Frank Lucas.  Most of his old base in Little Dixie was merged into the Muskogee-based 2nd district.  The western portion, including Watkins' former home in Ada, was drawn into the Norman-based 4th district.  Faced with the prospect of running in territory that he did not know and that did not know him, Watkins announced he would retire for good. In an indication of how much his politics had changed since leaving the House for the first time, Watkins served as honorary chairman for conservative Senator Jim Inhofe's bid for a second full term.

Legacy
After retirement, Wes Watkins continued to focus on issues of economic development, global hunger, global trade, and utilizing innovative technologies to address these issues.  He founded a non-profit ministry, Matthew 24.40 Foundation, to provide scholarships for students to install hydroponics systems in diverse global locations to address issues of hunger.
The Wes Watkins Center for International Trade Development at Oklahoma State University was established in 1990 to increase the economic competitiveness of the state of Oklahoma and to assist Oklahoma-based businesses to engage in global trade. It is an extension unit within the School of Global Studies and Partnerships at Oklahoma State University.
Wes Watkins Technology Center
Inducted into Oklahoma CareerTech Hall of Fame in 1991.
Wes Watkins Reservoir in central Oklahoma was named in honor of him.

See also
 Politics of Oklahoma
 Oklahoma's congressional districts
 Oklahoma Democratic Party
 Oklahoma Republican Party
 Little Dixie
 Party switching in the United States
 Wes Watkins Reservoir

References

External links
 Wes Watkins at Biographical Directory of the U.S. Congress
 Wes Watkins CareerTech Hall of Fame Bio
 
 Voices of Oklahoma interview. First person interview conducted on March 1, 2017, with Wes Watkins.

|-

|-

1938 births
20th-century American politicians
21st-century American politicians
Democratic Party members of the United States House of Representatives
Living people
Military personnel from Oklahoma
Democratic Party Oklahoma state senators
Oklahoma Independents
Oklahoma State University alumni
People from Bryan County, Oklahoma
People from De Queen, Arkansas
Republican Party members of the United States House of Representatives from Oklahoma